Wendell Hayes (August 5, 1940 - December 28, 2019) was a former American football running back.  Wendell played college football at Humboldt State University.  He played in the National Football League (NFL) for the Dallas Cowboys, Denver Broncos and the AFL's Kansas City Chiefs, which included the team that defeated the Minnesota Vikings in the fourth and final AFL-NFL World Championship Game.

Early years
Hayes attended McClymonds High School where he developed into an exceptional multi-sport athlete. He received All-Oakland Athletic League honors in football, basketball and track. He was also an amateur boxer.

He was mentored by Earl Meneweather who became California's first High School African American Head Football Coach in 1957. He was a dominant running back in football. He played on two undefeated basketball teams, that included Paul Silas and Aaron Pointer.

He moved on to Merritt College before transferring to Humboldt State University, where he played football, basketball and track.

Professional career

Dallas Cowboys
Hayes signed as an undrafted free agent with the Dallas Cowboys in 1963. Injuries limited him to only one regular season game. He was waived on August 30, 1964.

Denver Broncos (first stint)
He signed with the Denver Broncos in 1964 but was released before the start of the season.

Oakland Raiders
The Oakland Raiders signed him to their taxi squad in 1964, before being cut in December.

Denver Broncos (second stint)
The Denver Broncos brought him back for their training camp in 1965 and surprised observers not just by making the team, but also starting in the same backfield with Cookie Gilchrist, finishing with 526 rushing yards (second on the team).

In 1966, although he was undersized for the position, he was moved to fullback after Gilchrist announced his retirement and led the team in rushing with 417 yards.

On January 19, 1968, he was traded along with Goldie Sellers and a player to be named later to the Kansas City Chiefs, in exchange for a third (#75-Bob Vaughan) and fourth round (#102-Drake Garrett) draft choices.

Kansas City Chiefs
Hayes was placed on the injured reserve list on October 31, 1968. He became a starter at fullback in 1970 and kept that role four years, until being relegated back to a reserve role. He was waived on April 21, 1975.

References

External links
 Broncos Feel Hayes Is Answer to Cookie and Fullback Woes 

1940 births
2019 deaths
American football running backs
Players of American football from Dallas
Players of American football from Oakland, California
Dallas Cowboys players
Denver Broncos (AFL) players
Humboldt State Lumberjacks football players
Kansas City Chiefs players
American Football League players